Fritz Obersiebrasse (born 30 November 1940 in Bielefeld) is a retired German sprinter who competed in the 1964 Summer Olympics.

References

1940 births
Living people
German male sprinters
Olympic athletes of the United Team of Germany
Athletes (track and field) at the 1964 Summer Olympics
Sportspeople from Bielefeld
Universiade medalists in athletics (track and field)
Universiade gold medalists for West Germany
Medalists at the 1965 Summer Universiade